Kelly Macdonald (born 23 February 1976) is a Scottish actress. Known for her performances on film and television, she has received various accolades including a BAFTA Award, a Primetime Emmy Award, and four Screen Actors Guild Awards.

Macdonald made her film debut in Danny Boyle's Trainspotting (1996). Her notable film roles include in the acclaimed films Elizabeth (1998), Gosford Park (2001), Intermission (2003), and Nanny McPhee (2005). She received a BAFTA Award for Best Actress in a Supporting Role for her role in the Coen brothers film No Country for Old Men (2007). She also appeared in Harry Potter and the Deathly Hallows – Part 2 (2011), Anna Karenina (2012), T2 Trainspotting (2017), and Operation Mincemeat (2021). She voiced Princess Merida in the Disney Pixar animated film Brave (2012).

Also known for her television roles she received the  Primetime Emmy Award for Outstanding Supporting Actress in a Miniseries or a Movie for her performance in the BBC One film The Girl in the Cafe (2005). From 2010 to 2014 she starred as Margaret Thompson in the HBO series Boardwalk Empire for which she received nominations for a Primetime Emmy Award and two Golden Globe Awards. Macdonald is also known for her roles in the Black Mirror episode "Hated in the Nation" (2016), and the limited series Giri/Haji (2019). In 2021, MacDonald joined the cast of Line of Duty.

Early life
Macdonald was born on 23 February 1976 in Glasgow, Scotland, and grew up in Neilston. Her parents divorced when she was young. She was raised along with her brother David, by her mother, who was a garment industry sales executive. Macdonald attended Eastwood High School from 1989 to 1993.

Career

Macdonald's career began while she was working as a barmaid in Glasgow. She saw a leaflet advertising an open casting session for Trainspotting and decided to audition, winning the part of Diane, the underage seductress to Ewan McGregor's Renton. Other roles include Mary O'Neary in Two Family House, and an actress playing Peter Pan in Finding Neverland. She had major roles in Robert Altman's British period piece Gosford Park, where she played an aristocrat's maid, and in Intermission (2003), as Deirdre.

On radio, she portrayed Mary in the 1999 BBC radio drama Lifehouse, based on Pete Townshend's abandoned rock opera, some of the songs for which were released on The Who's album Who's Next. On television, her highest profile roles have been in two BBC dramas, the Paul Abbott serial State of Play (2003), and the one-off Richard Curtis piece The Girl in the Café (2005). Both of these were directed by David Yates, and both also starred Bill Nighy. For her performance in The Girl in the Café, she was nominated for the Golden Globe Award for Best Actress – Miniseries or Television Film in 2006, and won the Primetime Emmy Award for Outstanding Supporting Actress in a Miniseries or a Movie.

Macdonald had a supporting role in the Coen brothers' Academy Award-winning film No Country for Old Men (2007), for which she was nominated for a BAFTA Award for Best Actress in a Supporting Role. It was reported that she had to fight her agent to be considered for the role, but Macdonald later denied the story.

Other films where she had supporting roles include Choke (2008), the film adapted by Clark Gregg from the 2001 Chuck Palahniuk novel, as Paige Marshall; In the Electric Mist (2009) (based on James Lee Burke's In the Electric Mist with Confederate Dead (1993), as Kelly Drummond, alongside Tommy Lee Jones and John Goodman; and Skellig (2009), as Louise. She played the lead in The Merry Gentleman (2008).

In 2011, she played the "Grey Lady" (revealed to be Helena Ravenclaw) in Harry Potter and the Deathly Hallows – Part 2, the final instalment of the Harry Potter film franchise. She replaced Nina Young, who originally played the role. In 2012, she provided the voice of Merida, the heroine of the Disney/Pixar film Brave, and played Dolly in Anna Karenina. She starred in the romantic comedy film The Decoy Bride, which was released in 2012.

From 2010 until its ending in 2014, she starred in the HBO crime drama Boardwalk Empire as Margaret Thompson, the wife of Prohibition-era Atlantic City crime boss Nucky Thompson (Steve Buscemi). She appeared in all five seasons of the series. In 2011, she and the rest of the show's cast were awarded the Screen Actors Guild Award for Outstanding Performance by an Ensemble in a Drama Series. In 2016, she starred in Ricky Gervais' Special Correspondents as Claire Maddox, and Swallows and Amazons as Mrs. Walker. In 2016, she played the lead role in "Hated in the Nation", an episode of the anthology series Black Mirror for which she received critical acclaim. On 3 November 2016 Macdonald was featured in the trailer for Danny Boyle's T2 Trainspotting confirming she would reprise her role as Diane from the original film, which she did.  In 2017, she co-starred opposite Benedict Cumberbatch in the BBC film The Child in Time. Macdonald played the guest lead in the sixth series of the BBC's police drama Line of Duty.

Personal life
In August 2003, Macdonald married musician Dougie Payne, bassist of the rock band Travis. They have two sons. They moved back to their hometown of Glasgow in 2014, after living in London and New York City. They separated in 2017.

Filmography

Film

Television

Video games

Awards and nominations

Honours
Eastwood High School, where she was a pupil, has a drama studio and theatre named in her honour.

References

External links
 
 
 
 Kelly Macdonald in Skellig on Sky1, Easter 2009

1976 births
Living people
20th-century Scottish actresses
21st-century Scottish actresses
Actresses from Glasgow
Audiobook narrators
Outstanding Performance by a Cast in a Motion Picture Screen Actors Guild Award winners
Outstanding Performance by a Supporting Actress in a Miniseries or Movie Primetime Emmy Award winners
People educated at Eastwood High School, Newton Mearns
Scottish film actresses
Scottish radio actresses
Scottish television actresses
Scottish video game actresses
Scottish voice actresses